Rúrik Gíslason (born 25 February 1988) is an Icelandic former professional footballer who played as a midfielder.

Club career
Rúrik started his career with HK Kópavogur in his youth. Following a youth stint at R.S.C. Anderlecht, the then-champions of Belgium, he made his senior debut with HK Kópavogur.

At the end of August 2005, Rúrik signed for Charlton Athletic, but failed to make an appearance for Charlton's first team.

On 10 November 2020, Rúrik announced his retirement from football. He appeared on series 14 of the German TV programme Let’s Dance and won the competition.

International career
In 2011, Rúrik was chosen as part of the Iceland U21 squad to represent Iceland at the 2011 UEFA European Under-21 Football Championship in Denmark. The striker was named on the bench for the opening game against Belarus.

In May 2018 he was named in Iceland's 23-man squad for the 2018 World Cup in Russia.

Personal life
Rúrik was a candidate for the centre-right Independence Party in the 2016 Icelandic parliamentary election and 2017 Icelandic parliamentary election.

After Iceland's 2018 FIFA World Cup game against Argentina, Rúrik's Instagram profile went viral, as his followers increased by 250,000 after the game. His follower count was right over one million in June 2018, more than triple the size of Iceland's current population.

In 2021, Rúrik appeared in the action-comedy film Cop Secret, directed by Hannes Þór Halldórsson.

Career statistics

International

Scores and results list Iceland's goal tally first, score column indicates score after each Rúrik goal.

Honours
Copenhagen
Danish Superliga: 2012–13
Danish Cup: 2014–15

References

External links

SV Sandhausen profile

'Rurik Gislason Fans'

1988 births
Living people
Rurik Gislason
Rurik Gislason
Association football midfielders
Association football forwards
Rurik Gislason
Rurik Gislason
Rurik Gislason
2018 FIFA World Cup players
Rurik Gislason
Charlton Athletic F.C. players
Viborg FF players
Odense Boldklub players
F.C. Copenhagen players
1. FC Nürnberg players
1. FC Nürnberg II players
SV Sandhausen players
Rurik Gislason
Danish Superliga players
Danish 1st Division players
2. Bundesliga players
Regionalliga players
Rurik Gislason
Expatriate footballers in England
Rurik Gislason
Expatriate footballers in Germany
Rurik Gislason
Expatriate men's footballers in Denmark
Rurik Gislason